Oh Hyun-min (born June 6, 1995) is South Korean television personality. He is known for being a finalist for the reality show, The Genius: Black Garnet and formerly a cast member in The Genius: Grand Final.

Filmography

Television

References

External links

1995 births
Living people
South Korean television personalities
Woollim Entertainment artists
KAIST alumni
South Korean Protestants
People from Mokpo